Dümmler is a German surname:

 Ferdinand Dümmler Sr. (1777–1846), a German book seller and publisher
 Ernst Ludwig Dümmler (1830–1902), a German historian; son of Ferdinand Sr.
 (Georg) Ferdinand Dümmler (1859–1896), a German classical philologist and archaeologist; son of Ernst

References 

German-language surnames
German families